#2 is an EP by Suburban Kids with Biblical Names, released on May 18, 2005 by Labrador Records. "Funeral Face" was the only track to be carried on to their album #3.

Track listing

References

2005 EPs
Suburban Kids with Biblical Names EPs
Labrador Records EPs